The Type 54 and its variants (Type 51, M20, TU-90 and Model 213 pistols) are Chinese copies of the Soviet type Tokarev TT-33.

Type 54 pistols are also known colloquially as "Black Star" pistols (Traditional Chinese:黑星手槍, Simplified Chinese: 黑星手枪) due to the five-pointed star engraved on its all-black grip panel.

Description
The Type 54 is the improved version of the Type 51 (Chinese copy of the TT-33) produced after the Korean War. The Type 51 was first adopted in 1951 and produced in Shenyang's Factory 66 using both Soviet and Chinese-made parts. In 1954, after approximately 250,000 pistols were manufactured, the designation was changed to Type 54 and the pistol used exclusively indigenous components. This type of pistol is commonly available in 7.62×25mm caliber, although some variants have been made in 9×19mm Parabellum.

Though the QSZ-92 (Type 92) has supplemented the Type 54 in the Army, the weapon is still in service in some of the Chinese armed forces (such as the People's Armed Police and some People's Liberation Army troops) today.

The Vietnamese used the Type 54 during the Vietnam War, with the designation súng ngắn K-54 (a Vietnamese translation from the Chinese 54式手枪 (type 54 hand gun), with K for Kiểu being type). Type 54 pistols were smuggled into Japan in a significant quantity, often for use by the Yakuza.

Variants
Norinco, the People's Liberation Army's state weapons manufacturer in China, still manufactures a commercial variant of the Tokarev pistol chambered in the more common 9×19mm Parabellum round, known as the Tokarev Model 213, as well as in the original 7.62×25mm caliber. It features a safety catch, which was absent on Soviet-produced TT-33 handguns. Furthermore, the Model 213 features the thin slide grip grooves, as opposed to the original Russian wide-types. The 9×19mm model is featured with a magazine well block mounted in the rear of the magazine well to accept 9×19mm-type magazines without frame modification.

The Norinco model in current production is not available for sale in the United States due to import prohibitions on Chinese firearms, although older handguns of the Model 213 type imported in the 1980s and 1990s are common.

The M20 was a version of the Type 54 made without factory markings to conceal the weapon's origins. Many of these were provided to North Vietnamese forces during the Vietnam War, which is also called K54. An updated version known as the K14-VN is made by Factory Z111, and has an increased capacity of 13 rounds, with a wider grip to incorporate a double stack magazine, which is based on the Tokarev Model 213. Research and development started in 2001. The K14-VN began to see service with PAVN forces on May 10, 2014.

The TU-90 (also known as the NP-10 or Model 213-B) is an improved Model 213 similar to the Hungarian-designed and manufactured, Egyptian contracted Tokagypt 58 of the 1950s. Construction is primarily of forged and machined steel, with a matte blued finish. The grips are of wrap-around rubber ribbed on the side.

Newer variants like the WQ213B54, 213-A and NT04, with a double stacked magazine, have been developed.

The industry name for the regular K54 and the K14-VN is known as SN7M and the SN7TD.

Users

References

7.62×25mm Tokarev semi-automatic pistols
9mm Parabellum semi-automatic pistols
.38 Super semi-automatic pistols
Cold War weapons of China
China–Soviet Union relations
Police weapons
Semi-automatic pistols of the People's Republic of China
Short recoil firearms
TT platform
Weapons and ammunition introduced in 1954
Norinco